Zeltser or Seltser is a Jewish surname. Notable people with the surname include:

 Mark Zeltser (born 1947), Soviet-born American pianist
 Vladimir Zeltser (1905–1937), Soviet historian

See also 
 Seltzer (surname)
 Death of Andrei Zeltser

Jewish surnames